is a Japanese manga artist and author from Mutsu, Aomori Prefecture.

He won prizes in 39th and the 40th Tezuka Awards. He made his professional manga debut with WORLDS in 1990. All of his works are published by Shueisha under their Shōnen Jump labels. He has also illustrated four light novels and released two comprehensive art books across his career.

Fujisaki is best known for the series Hoshin Engi, which was adapted into an anime series in 1999 and again in 2018 as well as several radio dramas and video games. He also adapted the novel Shiki written by Fuyumi Ono into a manga which in turn was adapted into an anime. More recently he is making a manga adaptation of the Legend of the Galactic Heroes novel series.

Both Hōshin Engi and Wāqwāq were released in English by Viz Media.

Works

Manga 
PSYCHO+ (1992 - 1993), serialized in Weekly Shōnen Jump, 2 volumes
Includes in second volume shorts: Source of Infection (1993, Summer Shonen Jump special edition) and DIGITALIAN (1993, Autumn Shonen Jump special edition)
 , serialized in Weekly Shōnen Jump, 23 volumes
 , serialized in Weekly Shōnen Jump, 2 volumes
 , serialized in Weekly Shōnen Jump, 4 volumes
 , serialized in Jump Square, 11 volumes
 , serialized in Weekly Young Jump, 8 volumes
 , serialized in Weekly Young Jump

Shorter works
Worlds - Short Story Collection
 (1990), received an honorable mention in the 39th Tezuka Awards 
WORLDS (1990/1991, Winter Shonen Jump special edition), received second prize in the 40th Tezuka Awards
TIGHT ROPE (1991, Spring Shonen Jump special edition)
SHADOW DISEASE (1991, 45th Shonen Jump Issue)
SOUL of KNIGHT (1992, Spring Special Shonen Jump special edition)
Dramatic Irony - Short Story Collection
DRAMATIC IRONY (1995, Spring Shonen Jump special edition)
Yugamizumu (1997, 25th Shonen Jump Issue)
Milk Junkie (1999).
Houshin Engi Another Story (2001, in a combined Weekly Shonen Jump)
 , published in Jump the Revolution!

Illustrations 
Putitakityu (Artbook)
Shiki (Guidebook)
Hoshin Taizen (Guidebook)
Fuusui Tengi (Light Novel)
Nemuri Hime ha Mahou wo Tsukau (Light Novel)
RIPPER GAME (Light Novel)
D Shitsu no Koneko no Bouken (Light Novel)

Games 
Senkaiden Hoshin Engi Senkai Ibunroku Juntei Taisen (GBC)
Senkaiden Hoshin Engi Yori (Wonderswan)
Senkaiden Hoshin Engi Yori 2 (Wonderswan)
Senkai Taisen: Senkaiden Hoshin Engi Yori (PlayStation)
Senkai Tsuuroku Seishi: Senkaiden Hoshin Engi Yori (PlayStation)
Jump Ultimate Stars (Hōshin Engi characters only)
Phantasy Star Portable 2 (Collaboration)

Other 
Kyousei Majin Guririn Puncher (Character Design)

References

External links
 

1971 births
Japanese illustrators
Living people
Manga artists from Aomori Prefecture